Philippine Science High School Southern Mindanao Campus (abbreviated as PSHS-SMC) is the first regional campus of the Philippine Science High School System, a specialized public high school in Davao City, Philippines. It caters to scientifically and mathematically gifted high school students from the Southern Mindanao region of the country. It is located in Barangay Sto. Niño, Tugbok District, Davao City.

History

PSHS-SMC, formerly known as PSHS Mindanao Campus prior to the creation of the PSHS Central Mindanao Campus in Lanao del Norte, was first established at the Philippine Coconut Authority grounds in Bago Oshiro, Barangay Mintal in Tugbok District. It was officially founded on July 8, 1988.

Due to an increasing number of students, the school administration decided to relocate to a larger site. The new building's infrastructure was completed in 1990.

By 1995, mud and asphalt lanes on the grounds of the school had been cemented and the gardens had been replanted and redesigned. The school surroundings gradually developed into a park. Some years later, a large gymnasium was built behind the boys' dormitory, accessible via a footbridge.

In 2008, renovation of the gym resumed. With the new stage completed, it was temporarily opened in March that year for the graduation ceremony.

A new Science and Technology building, with laboratories and a 90-seat mini-auditorium, was completed in 2011.

Since mid-2012, a new oval track has been under construction behind the outdoor courts, which in turn are located behind the gym.

The campus is currently composed of the Administration Building, the Academic Building (where classes are held), the Boys' and Girls' Residence Halls, the Gym, the Canteen, and the Science and Technology Building.

For the first 19 years from its founding, the school's director was Rosita Fundador, before her mandatory retirement. She was succeeded by Delia C. Legaspino. On 2021, she was succeeded by Dr. Jonald P. Fenecios, 12 years after her service.

Admission
Admission to the PSHS-SMC is usually possible only in the first year, with lateral entry in the second and third years possible in rare cases. Applicants from grade six (or grade seven) must perform well in the National Competitive Examination (NCE), the admission test of the Philippine Science High School System.

Curriculum
The PSHS-SMC follows the curriculum prescribed by the Philippine Science High School System, with electives varying per campus.

Electives
Before the implementation of the K12 curriculum, students were required to take up one elective subject per year equivalent to one unit, starting from their second year. However, as a result of the new curriculum starting in 2012-2013, the class of 2018 will have their electives starting from their fourth year.

Summer Science Internship Program
In the summer before their fifth year, to comply with their Summer Science Internship Program (SSIP) requirements, each student is required to complete 80 hours in an approved workplace for work experience related to science and technology. Approved workplaces include various international, national, or local agencies, as well as government agencies, educational institutions, and private corporations. This internship has no impact on the students' grades, but is a mandatory requirement for graduation. After completing 80 working hours in their institution, they are required to present a portfolio showcasing their work in their agency.

Students who attend the Ateneo Junior Summer Seminar (AJSS) of the Ateneo de Manila University are not required to complete internships, as their participation in the AJSS is accepted for their SSIP.

References

External links
PSHS Southern Mindanao Campus official website

Philippine Science High School System
Schools in Davao City